Mawal taluka, whose name is also spelled as Maval, is an administrative area of Pune district, in the state of Maharashtra, India. At the time of the 2011 Census of India, it comprised 187 villages, a figure that was unchanged from 2001. Among those were the six uninhabited villages of Nandgaon, Jevare, Budhele, Pale Pawan Mawal, Shevati and Phagane.

A
 Adavi
 Adhale Budruk
 Adhale Khurd
 Adhe Khurd
 Ahirvade
 Ajivali
 Akurdi
 Ambale
 Ambegaon
 Ambi
 Apati
 Atvan
 Aundhe Khurd
 Aundholi

B
 Badhalawadi
 Baur
 Bebad Ohol
 Bedse
 Belaj
 Bhadawali
 Bhaje
 Bhajgaon
 Bhoyare
 Boraj
 Borivali
 Brahmanoli
 Brahman Wadi
 Brahmanwadi
 Budhavadi

C
 Chandkhed
 Chavsar
 Chikhalse

D
 Dahivali
 Dahuli
 Darumbare
 Devale
 Devghar
 Dhalewadi
 Dhamane
 Dhangavhan
 Divad
 Done
 Dongargaon
 Dudhivare

G
 Gahunje
 Gevhande Apati
 Gevhande Khadak
 Ghonshet
 Godumbare
 Govitri

I
 Induri
 Inglun

J
 Jadhavwadi
 Jambavade
 Jambhavali
 Jambhul
 Jovan

K
 Kacharewadi
 Kadadhe
 Kadav
 Kale
 Kalhat
 Kambare Andar Mawal
 Kambare Nane Mawal
 Kamshet
 Kanhe
 Karandoli
 Karanjgaon
 Karla
 Karunj
 Kashal
 Katavi
 Keware
 Khand
 Khandashi
 Kivale
 Kolechafesar
 Kondivade Andar Mawal
 Kondivade Nane Mawal
 Kothurne
 Kune Ansute
 Kune Nane Mawal
 Kurvande
 Kusavali
 Kusgaon Khurd
 Kusgaon Pawan Mawal
 Kusur

L
 Lohagad

M
 Mahagaon
 Majgaon
 Malavandi Thule
 Malawali Nane Mawal
 Malawali Pawan Mawal
 Malegaon Budruk
 Malegaon Khurd
 Malewadi
 Mangarul
 Mau
 Mendhewadi
 Mohitewadi
 Moramarwadi
 Morave
 Mundhavare

N
 Nagathali
 Nandgaon
 Nane
 Nanoli Nane Mawal
 Nanoli Tarf Chakan
 Navlakhumbre
 Nayagaon
 Nesave
 Nigade

O
 Ovale
 Ozarde

P
 Pachane
 Pale Nane Mawal
 Pangaloli
 Pansoli
 Parandvadi
 Paravadi
 Patan
 Pathargaon
 Pawalewadi
 Phalane
 Pimpal Khunte
 Pimpaloli
 Pimpari
 Prabhachiwadi
 Pusane

R
 Rajpuri
 Rakaswadi

S
 Sadapur
 Sadavali
 Sai
 Salumbare
 Sangavade
 Sangavi
 Sangise
 Sate
 Sawale
 Sawantwadi
 Shilatane
 Shilimb
 Shindgaon
 Shirdhe
 Shire
 Shirgaon
 Shivali
 Shivane
 Somatane
 Somavadi
 Sudhavadi
 Sudumbare

T
 Taje
 Takave Budruk
 Takave Khurd
 Talegaon Dabhade
 Thakursai
 Thoran
 Thugaon
 Tikona
 Tung

U
 Udhewadi
 Ukasan
 Umbare Navalakh
 Urse

V
 Vadavali
 Vadeshwar
 Vadivale
 Vagheshwar
 Valakh
 Valavanti
 Varale
 Varsoli
 Varu
 Vaund
 Vehergaon
 Velhavali

W
 Wahangaon
 Waksai

Y
 Yelase
 Yelghol

References

 
Mawal